Frank Kuppner (born 1951 in Glasgow) is a Scottish poet and novelist.

Life
He has been Writer in Residence at various institutions, currently at University of Glasgow, and Strathclyde University.

Awards
 2008 Creative Scotland Award
 1995 McVitie’s Writer of the Year Award, for Something Very Like Murder
 1984 Scottish Arts Council Book Award, for A Bad Day for the Sung Dynasty
 1972 AKROS Hugh Macdiarmid 80th Birthday Poetry Competition

Works

Poetry

Non-Fiction

Fiction

Reviews
A God's Breakfast is three books in one. The first and longest is "The Uninvited Guest", a sequence of hundreds of cod-classical epigrams and fragments; the third, "What Else is There?" a collection of 120 shorter poems. The rest of the volume is given up to "West Åland, or Five Tombeaux for Mr Testoil". At 48 pages, "West Åland" is about as long as The Waste Land and Four Quartets combined and is, I'd reckon, the most protracted dance ever made by one poet upon the grave of another.

References

External links
"James Keery reviews The Failure of Conservatism in Modern British Poetry", Jacket 30

Living people
Scottish poets
1951 births